Prithvi-vallabha, or , was a title adopted by several kings that ruled in present-day India, including the Chalukyas of Vatapi, the Rashtrakutas and their successors.

Chalukyas of Vatapi 
All the sovereign rulers of the Vatapi Chalukya dynasty bore the title Shri-prithvi-vallabha, which means "the husband of the goddess of fortune and the Earth" (that is, Vishnu). Mangalesha bore the exact title Prithvi-vallabha, as attested by the Mahakuta inscriptions. The Manor inscription of the Chalukya governor Jayashraya Mangalarasa, dated to 7 April 691 (year 613 of the Shaka era), also mentions Prithvi-vallabha as one of his titles. His son Avanijanashraya Pulakeshin also bore the title.

Rashtrakutas 
Among the Rashtrakutas, the title was first adopted by Dantidurga, an 8th-century ruler of the Deccan and the founder of the Rashtrakuta dynasty. Prithvi means "the earth" and vallabha means either "head of household" or "lover", thus the title can be loosely translated as Lord of the Earth. Since Prithvi was also the name of an earth goddess controlled by Lord Vishnu, the title went so far as to equate Dantidurga and his heirs with the Hindu god Vishnu. The title was abbreviated to vallabha and was written by Muslim observers as Balhara.

Later dynasties 
The title was also adopted by the Chalukyas of Kalyani, who succeeded the Rashtrakutas in Deccan. The title was also used by Munja alias Vakpati of Paramara dynasty, which succeeded the Rashtrakutas in Malwa.

See also
Balhara (title), Arabic transliteration of Vallabha
Hammira, Sanskrit transliteration of Arabic emir
Suratrana, Sanskrit transliteration of Arabic sultan

References

Citations

Works cited 

 
 
 

Hindu monarchs
History of Karnataka
Rashtrakuta dynasty